Sagne may refer to:

La Sagne - Switzerland
Sagne, Mauritania